Neoregelia pineliana is a species in the genus Neoregelia in the bromeliad family. This species is native to Brazil.

Cultivars
 Neoregelia 'Amethyst'
 Neoregelia 'Brian's Beauty'
 Neoregelia 'Brilliance'
 Neoregelia 'Bronze Agate'
 Neoregelia 'Indigo Pearl'
 Neoregelia 'Lurid'
 Neoregelia 'Malibu'
 Neoregelia 'Melba'
 Neoregelia 'Pink Concentrate'
 Neoregelia 'Pink Galaxy'
 Neoregelia 'Pinol'
 Neoregelia 'Porphyry Pearl'
 Neoregelia 'Purple Queen'
 Neoregelia 'Red Pine'
 Neoregelia 'Reward'
 Neoregelia 'Sandstorm'
 Neoregelia 'Sudan'
 Neoregelia 'Ted's Red'
 Neoregelia 'Travis Mays'

References

BSI Cultivar Registry Retrieved 11 October 2009

pineliana
Flora of Brazil